Henrik (Heikki) Viktor Lindroos (31 May 1865 – 16 April 1915) was a Finnish cooperative manager and politician, born in Messukylä. He was a member of the Diet of Finland from 1904 to 1905 and of the Parliament of Finland from 1907 to 1908, representing the Social Democratic Party of Finland (SDP).

References

1865 births
1915 deaths
Politicians from Tampere
People from Häme Province (Grand Duchy of Finland)
Social Democratic Party of Finland politicians
Members of the Diet of Finland
Members of the Parliament of Finland (1907–08)